Onconida is a genus of squat lobsters in the family Munididae, containing the following species:
 Onconida alaini Baba & de Saint Laurent, 1996
 Onconida gemini Baba & de Saint Laurent, 1996
 Onconida modica Baba & de Saint Laurent, 1996
 Onconida prostrata Baba & de Saint Laurent, 1996
 Onconida tropis Baba & de Saint Laurent, 1996

References

External links

Squat lobsters